Goats expressing the Swiss Marked pattern have a black (eumelanin pigment) body and belly and tan (phaeomelanin pigment) legs, ears, and facial stripes. The allele which codes for this pattern is located at the agouti locus of the goat genome. There are multiple modifier genes which control how much tan pigment is actually expressed and so the tan areas can range from pure white to deep red.  There may also be present dilution genes which turn the black areas in the pattern to either chocolate or medium brown.

Goat color patterns